Out of the Wasteland is the seventh studio album by American alternative rock band Lifehouse, released May 26, 2015, through Ironworks Music. It debuted at No. 1 on Billboard's US Independent Albums chart.

Background

Hiatus and solo projects
After a lukewarm reception to the band's previous album Almeria, Lifehouse refrained from touring and announced in July 2013 that they chose to leave Interscope Records to spend time focusing on each member's respective solo project. Drummer Rick Woolstenhulme, Jr. began touring with the Goo Goo Dolls; bassist Bryce Soderberg initiated a new band titled KOMOX; lead guitarist Ben Carey left the band to continue work in country rock band Elvis Monroe; and singer/songwriter Jason Wade worked on a solo record titled Paper Cuts.

In his home studio, Wade wrote approximately 70 songs in genres including country and folk over the course of 18 months. Said Wade, "as soon as I wrote "Flight" and "Hurricane," that's when it really started to sink in that I wanted to get the band back together... Those songs started to feel like quintessential Lifehouse tracks. I called the guys up to finish the album together. This is a full circle for us. It really sees us returning to our roots."

Writing
The majority of the record was written in 2013, however several previously-unreleased songs were recorded and included in the final release. "Wish" was written in 2001 and intended to be the final track on the band's 2002 album  Stanley Climbfall, before being replaced with "The Beginning"; played on tour in 2011 and recorded with Jim Cox in April 2014, Wade stated that he was glad the song "finally made its way". "Stardust" was a 2013 song written and performed by bassist Bryce Soderberg with his side project KOMOX before being rerecorded as a Lifehouse song. "Central Park" was written in 2007 and originally tracked just prior to the March 2010 release of Smoke & Mirrors, while "Angeline" was written prior to the Almería sessions. "Wish", "Central Park", "Clarity", and "Angeline" were originally slated for Wade's shelved solo album, Paper Cuts, initially set for a 2013 release. "Hourglass" began in the early 1990s as an instrumental piece by producer Jude Cole and film score composer James Newton Howard, before resurfacing during the Out of the Wasteland sessions; Cole suggested Wade write the lyrics and finish the song with Howard.

Release
Lifehouse released "Flight" independently for digital download on November 18, and announced that a new album would be released in April 2015 titled Seven. On November 20, the band began a contest through online music design agency Creative Allies for fans and graphic designers to create the official album cover. The contest closed on 15 December, and a winner was chosen in early January.

On January 27, Lifehouse revealed through Billboard.com that the album would be titled Out of the Wasteland and released May 19, 2015 under Ironworks Music. Due to the name change, a new album cover was revealed, incorporating elements of the winning design. Along with the track listing for the standard edition of the album, the first radio single "Hurricane" was released for digital download the same day.

On April 7, the album was made available for pre-order in a variety of collector's packages, with the release date moved back one week to May 26. Simultaneously, the acoustic ballad "Wish" was made available for immediate download on iTunes. On May 13, the band acoustically debuted "Yesterday's Son" for Billboard Magazine. The standard edition of the album was featured on Pandora Premieres for full streaming on May 19.

Promotion
Lifehouse announced that they would be opening for Nickelback during the second leg of their No Fixed Address Tour, from June 19 to August 29, 2015. On June 23, they announced that the tour had been cancelled due to the health of Nickelback lead singer Chad Kroeger, and promised a European tour in the fall. The band began a headlining tour in Europe on September 15 with supporting act Raglans, stopped in Pasay, Philippines on October 8, and continued in Australia and New Zealand from October 11 to October 19, 2015. With the departure of former touring guitarist and band member Ben Carey, Steve Stout became Lifehouse' fourth touring member to date.

The band debuted eight new tracks, including "Hurricane", "One for the Pain", "Flight", and "Runaways" as a full band, and "Firing Squad", "Alien", "Yesterday's Son", and "H2O" acoustically. "Angeline", "Wish" and "Stardust" had debuted live in 2011, 2012, and early 2015, respectively. During his solo acoustic set, Wade notably debuted several rare, never-performed Blyss demoes from the late 1990s, including "Joshua" and "Eighties".

Tour dates

Critical reception

Out of the Wasteland received positive reviews from music critics. AllMusic's Stephen Thomas Erlewine rates the album three stars out of five and states, "it is an immaculately constructed record, easing between insistent midtempo anthems and power ballads" that "indulge in middle-aged introspection". Alex Lai for Contact Music describes the album as "ultimately a welcome return for the band who provide a number of genuinely worthy songs to the Lifehouse legacy". Michael Weaver, giving the album four stars for Jesus Freak Hideout, writes, "Out of the Wasteland is a fine example of everything good about Lifehouse and anyone would be well-served to get this album today." Rating the album a nine out of ten for Cross Rhythms, Philip Laing writes, "This is overall an impressive return to form by the mainstream stalwarts." PluggedIn's Adam R. Holz comments on Wade's proclamation of returning to a more innocent place for writing, asserting that it "didn’t prevent Lifehouse's latest from overflowing with the kind of mature perspective on life and love, conflict and perseverance that no 17-year-old could ever articulate". Johan Wippsson writes for Melodic.net that 'Firing Squad' and 'Central Park' are "top class where the band feels hungry and 'real' again", concluding that the album "should be considered as one of the greatest in the genre".

Track listing
All tracks produced by Jason Wade, Jude Cole, and Chris "Winnie" Murguia; except "Stardust" produced by Bryce Soderberg and Tommy Walter.

Personnel
Lifehouse
Bryce Soderberg – bass, backing vocals, lead vocals on "Stardust"
Jason Wade – lead vocals, guitars, piano, co-lead vocals on "Stardust"
Rick Woolstenhulme, Jr. – drums, percussion
Additional Musicians

Production
Jude Cole, Chris "Winnie" Murguia, Jason Wade — Producers
Bryce Soderberg and Tommy Walter — Producers on "Stardust"
Chris Lord-Alge — Mixing
Florian Ammon — Mixing on "Hindsight", "You Are Not Alone", "Clarity", "Après La Vie", and "Exhale"
Mitch Lerner — Mixing on "Angeline"
Florian Ammon, Chris "Winnie" Murguia, Kevin Killen, Mitch Lerner, and Tommy Walter — Engineering
Keith Armstrong, and Nik Karpen — Additional Engineering
Ted Jensen — Mastering

Chart performance

References

Lifehouse (band) albums
2015 albums